Coming Back to You is the title of Melinda Doolittle's first album, released on February 3, 2009. The album consists of covers such as "Dust My Broom" from the 1930s, "Wonderful", from Aretha Franklin's 2003 release So Damn Happy, "Declaration of Love" from Celine Dion's 1996 release Falling into You and the title track, originally recorded by Macy Gray for the film Déjà Vu.

The album debuted at number 58 on the Billboard 200 on its first week of release, selling just over 10,900 copies.

Doolittle made her first promotional appearance for the album on The Ellen DeGeneres Show where she performed "It's Your Love".

Track listing
 "Fundamental Things" (David Batteau)- 3:19
 "It's Your Love" (Harry Bass & Stanley Ossman)- 2:45
 "Coming Back to You" (Phillip White, Macy Gray, Freddie Moffett and Harry Gregson-Williams)- 3:05
 "Declaration of Love" (Claude Gaudette)- 4:02
 "The Best of Everything" (Sammy Cahn)- 3:34
 "Wonderful" - (Phillip White, Ron Lawrence, Katrina Willis and Aleese Simmons) 3:05
 "Dust My Broom" (Robert Johnson)- 2:44
 "I'll Never Stop Loving You" (Sammy Cahn)- 3:04
 "I Will Be" (Bob Farrell and Tanya Leah)- 3:54
 "If I'm Not In Love" (Constant Change)- 4:29
 "Walkin' Blues" (Robert Johnson)- 2:47
 "We Will Find a Way" (Susan Sheridan)- 4:23
 "Wonder Why" (Sammy Cahn) - 4:14

Walmart bonus track
 "Through the Fire" (David Foster, Tom Keane, Cynthia Weil) *Walmart Exclusive Bonus Track

Personnel 

Raymond Angry – keyboards
Howie Beno – engineer, string arrangements, mixing
Cindy Blackman – drums
Michael Blanton – executive producer
John Chudoba – horn section
Chris Gehringer – mastering
David Hamilton – string arrangements
Frank Harkins – art direction
Russ Harrington – photography
Bill Harris Quintet – horn
Tom "Bones" Malone – horn arrangements, horn section
Michael Mangini – producer, string arrangements, mixing
Adam Pallin – bass, guitar, programming, horn arrangements, string arrangements
Bill Porricelli – executive producer
Tom Timko – horn section
John Titta – executive producer

References 

2009 debut albums
Melinda Doolittle albums